Ayman Taha (died 7 August 2014) was a senior Hamas official and the organization's spokesman in the Gaza Strip. Taha was co-founder of Hamas and also a former Hamas fighter.

Early life
Son of Mohammad Taha, a local Hamas official and director of the Islamic University of Gaza, in 1998, Ayman Taha served as the President of the Student Council of the university. He later served as a commander of the Izz al-Din al-Qassam Brigades in Bureij during the Second Intifada in the early 2000s.

Hamas
After the Hamas takeover of the Gaza Strip in June 2007, Taha became the group's spokesman for the territory. In February 2009, after returning from a Palestinian delegation in Egypt discussing a long-term truce with Israel, Egyptian authorities prevented Taha from entering the Gaza Strip with over $11 million. Instead he deposited it in an Egyptian bank in al-Arish. On 30 March, he announced in a discussion on a Nazareth-based radio station the Hamas "would not remain open forever" concerning the release of Israeli soldier Gilad Shalit. In July 2009, Taha noted that a "culture of resistance" is being promoted in Gaza after the Gaza War, stating "Armed resistance is still important and legitimate, but we have a new emphasis on cultural resistance... After the war, the fighters needed a break and the people needed a break."

Accusations of corruption
In February 2014, Ayman Taha was arrested and investigated for "misconduct, illegal profiteering, and betrayal of trust". The investigation is on-going, and the corruption and betrayal charges do not relate to or insinuate any collaboration with Israel but possibly with the United States.

Death
He was killed by a Hamas firing squad during Operation Protective Edge. Hamas accused him of being an Egyptian spy and executed him at point blank range. One source claims that he was executed because he may implicate several Hamas officials in a corruption scandal. Later, they blamed Israel for being responsible for his death, claiming he died from an Israeli airstrike.

References

Bibliography
 

2014 deaths
People from the Gaza Strip
Hamas members
Academic staff of the Islamic University of Gaza
People executed by firing squad
Deaths by firearm in the Gaza Strip
Year of birth missing